Dalbergia hildebrandtii is a species of legume in the family Fabaceae.
It is found only in Madagascar.
It is threatened by habitat loss.

References

hildebrandtii
Endemic flora of Madagascar
Vulnerable plants
Taxonomy articles created by Polbot